John Emmanuel Mahnken (June 16, 1922 – December 14, 2000) was an American professional basketball player.

A 6'8" center from West New York, New Jersey, Mahnken played high school basketball at Memorial High School in his hometown. He played at Georgetown University during the early 1940s, earning All-American honors in 1943. He served in the United States Army from 1943 to 1945, then embarked on a professional career in the National Basketball League with the Rochester Royals.  Mahnken won the 1946 league title on a Royals team which included future New York Knicks coach Red Holzman and future television actor Chuck Connors.

In 1946, Mahnken was signed by Red Auerbach to the Washington Capitols of the Basketball Association of America (which merged with the NBL in 1949 to become the modern NBA). Mahnken was traded to the Baltimore Bullets in 1948, and he was traded five other times until finding stability with the Boston Celtics in 1951. Mahnken competed for the Celtics until 1953, retiring from the NBA that year with career. statistics of 5.8 points per game and 2.9 rebounds per game. He holds the NBA record for worst career field goal percentage all-time.

BAA/NBA career statistics

Regular season

Playoffs

References

External links

1922 births
2000 deaths
All-American college men's basketball players
American men's basketball players
Baltimore Bullets (1944–1954) players
Basketball players from New Jersey
Boston Celtics players
Centers (basketball)
Fort Wayne Pistons players
Georgetown Hoyas men's basketball players
Indianapolis Jets players
Indianapolis Olympians players
Memorial High School (West New York, New Jersey) alumni
People from West New York, New Jersey
Rochester Royals players
Sportspeople from Hudson County, New Jersey
Tri-Cities Blackhawks players
Washington Capitols players
United States Army personnel of World War II